Emine Göğebakan (born 2001) is a Turkish taekwondo athlete.

Career 
Emine Göğebakan won the silver medal in the women's 46 kg event at the 2022 European Taekwondo Championships held in Manchester, England.

Tournament record

References 

Living people
2001 births
Turkish female taekwondo practitioners
European Taekwondo Championships medalists
Islamic Solidarity Games competitors for Turkey
21st-century Turkish women